The Battle of Carchemish was fought about 605 BC between the armies of Egypt allied with the remnants of the army of the former Assyrian Empire against the armies of Babylonia, allied with the Medes, Persians, and Scythians. This was while Nebuchadnezzar was commander-in-chief and Nabopolassar was still king of Babylon. Nebuchadnezzar became king right after this battle.

Background
When the Assyrian capital, Nineveh, was overrun by the Medes, Scythians, Babylonians and their allies in 612 BC, the Assyrians moved their capital to Harran. When Harran was captured by the alliance in 609 BC, ending the Assyrian Empire, remnants of the Assyrian army joined Carchemish, a city under Egyptian rule, on the Euphrates. Egypt, a former vassal of Assyria, was allied with Assyrian King Ashur-uballit II and marched in 609 BC to his aid against the Babylonians.

The Egyptian army of Pharaoh Necho II was delayed at Megiddo by the forces of King Josiah of Judah. Josiah was killed, and his army was defeated at the Battle of Megiddo.

The Egyptians and the Assyrians together crossed the Euphrates and laid siege to Harran, which they failed to retake. They then retreated to northwestern Assyria in what is now northeastern Syria.

Battle
The Egyptians met the full might of the Babylonian and Median army led by Nebuchadnezzar II at Carchemish, where the combined Egyptian and Assyrian forces were destroyed. Assyria ceased to exist as an independent power, and Egypt retreated and was no longer a significant force in the Ancient Near East. Babylonia reached its economic peak after 605 BC.

Records
The Nebuchadnezzar Chronicle, now housed in the British Museum, claims that Nebuchadnezzar "crossed the river to go against the Egyptian army which lay in Karchemiš. They fought with each other and the Egyptian army withdrew before him. He accomplished their defeat, decisively. As for the rest of the Egyptian army which had escaped from the defeat so quickly that no weapon had reached them, in the district of Hamath, the Babylonian troops overtook and defeated them so that not a single man escaped to his own country. At that time, Nebuchadnezzar conquered the whole area of Hamath."

The battle is also mentioned and described in the Bible, in the Book of Jeremiah.

Discrepancy 
While historians typically take Necho II to have been fighting in support of the remaining Assyrian forces, according to Flavius Josephus, in his account, Antiquities of the Jews Necho entered the battle to take advantage of the power vacuum created by the Assyrian forces' defeat.

See also

Siege of Kimuhu
Battle of Quramati 
Last stand

Notes

605 BC
7th-century BC conflicts
Battles involving Babylonia
Battles involving ancient Egypt
Hebrew Bible battles
Battles involving Assyria
7th century BC
Necho II